Juan Sáinz (born 20 August 1945) is a Mexican rower. He competed in the men's coxed pair event at the 1968 Summer Olympics.

References

External links
 

1945 births
Living people
Mexican male rowers
Olympic rowers of Mexico
Rowers at the 1968 Summer Olympics
Rowers from Mexico City